Kyle Degambur (born 18 March 1994) is a South African cricketer. He made his List A debut for Easterns in the 2016–17 CSA Provincial One-Day Challenge on 9 October 2016.

References

External links
 

1994 births
Living people
South African cricketers
Easterns cricketers
Place of birth missing (living people)